High Amana is an unincorporated community and census-designated place (CDP) in Iowa County, Iowa, United States, and is part of the "seven villages" of the Amana Colonies. As of the 2010 Census, the population of High Amana was 115.

Geography
It sits at the northern edge of the valley of the Iowa River.

Demographics

History

In 1881, High Amana contained a general store, sawmill, machine shop, and a blacksmith shop.

References

Amana Colonies
Unincorporated communities in Iowa
Unincorporated communities in Iowa County, Iowa
Census-designated places in Iowa County, Iowa